Camp Fire Camp El Tesoro is a  year-round camp located in Granbury, Texas southwest of Fort Worth. It has been accredited by the American Camp Association (ACA) for over 60 years.

Camp Fire Camp El Tesoro (Spanish for "The Treasure") was first established in 1934 near the De Cordova Bend of the Brazos River, an area rich in legends and history.

Camp El Tesoro has grown over the years and now includes a variety of year round opportunities such as family camping, spring break events, group retreats and outdoor education for students. During the summer El Tesoro offers traditional overnight camp, day camp and a camp for grieving children.

References

External links
Camp Fire Camp El Tesoro
Camp Fire First Texas

Campgrounds in the United States
1934 establishments in Texas
Buildings and structures in Hood County, Texas
El Tesoro
Camp Fire (organization)